St. Mary's Airport  is a public airport located four miles (6 km) west of the central business district of St. Mary's, in the Kusilvak Census Area of the U.S. state of Alaska. This airport is publicly owned by the State of Alaska Department of Transportation and Public Facilities (DOT&PF) - Northern Region.

Facilities

Airlines and destinations 

Prior to its bankruptcy and cessation of all operations, Ravn Alaska served the airport from multiple locations.

Top destinations

References

External links
 FAA Alaska airport diagram (GIF)
 

Airports in the Kusilvak Census Area, Alaska